Rodolfo Vega Calera (born February 4, 1974) is a Mexican football manager and former player.

References

Living people
1974 births
Mexican footballers
Association football midfielders
Club Universidad Nacional footballers
Liga MX players
Mexican football managers
Liga MX Femenil managers
Footballers from Veracruz
People from Veracruz (city)